The General Wayne Inn in Merion, Pennsylvania is a former tavern. It has been on the National Register of Historic Places since 1976. Established in 1704, it was previously named the William Penn Inn, Wayside Inn, Tunis Ordinary, and Streepers Tavern before being renamed in 1793 in honor of American Revolutionary War hero General "Mad" Anthony Wayne, who had once stayed there.

Murder and suicide 
Executive chef Jim Webb and his business partner Guy Sileo bought the General Wayne in 1995. Webb was found murdered there in his office on December 27, 1996. Felicia Moyse, a 20-year-old assistant chef at the inn and Sileo's girlfriend, committed suicide on February 22, 1997.

Moyse had been an alibi witness for Sileo. On the night of the murder, she and Sileo left the General Wayne at the same time, driving to dinner in their separate vehicles. Sileo doubled back, killed Webb using a gun later linked to him by forensic evidence, then rushed to arrive at dinner before Moyse.

Police believe that Moyse realized her boyfriend had set her up as his alibi and was unable to live with it.

Police were able to prove that Sileo had killed Webb in order to receive the $650,000 life insurance money from their partnership policies, before Webb could end their partnership and shut down the General Wayne. Sileo was convicted in 2001 and sentenced to life in prison.

Synagogue 
In 2005, the building was purchased and renovated by Chabad of the Main Line, and converted it into a synagogue and community center.

Famous people 

Famous people who visited the inn include:
 William Penn
 Anthony Wayne
 George Washington
 Edgar Allan Poe
 Gilbert du Motier, Marquis de Lafayette
 Benjamin Franklin
 Julius Erving
 Dylan Gelula

References

Notes

Further reading 
 

Hotel buildings on the National Register of Historic Places in Pennsylvania
Taverns in Pennsylvania
Taverns in the American Revolution
1704 establishments in Pennsylvania
American Revolutionary War sites
Lower Merion Township, Pennsylvania
Religious buildings and structures in Montgomery County, Pennsylvania
Commercial buildings completed in 1704
Orthodox synagogues in Pennsylvania
National Register of Historic Places in Montgomery County, Pennsylvania